Super Friends is an American animated television series about a team of superheroes which ran from 1980 to 1983 on ABC. It was produced by Hanna-Barbera Productions and is based on the Justice League and associated comic book characters published by DC Comics. It was the fifth incarnation of the Super Friends series following Super Friends (1973), The All-New Super Friends Hour (1977), Challenge of the Super Friends (1978) and The World's Greatest Super Friends (1979).

Format
With Super Friends, the series abandoned the production of half-hour episodes (which was the case for the previous two Super Friends series), in favor of the production of seven-minute shorts. Each hour long episode of Super Friends would feature a half-hour rerun from one of the previous six years along with three new shorts. Meanwhile, the second season from 1981–1982 was a shorter season due to a writers' strike.

Main characters
These new adventures featured appearances by the core group of the five classic Super Friends (Aquaman, Batman, Robin, Superman and Wonder Woman) along with Zan, Jayna & Gleek. A 1981 episode titled "Evil From Krypton" depicted the Superman's Fortress of Solitude with a somewhat crystalline exterior and without the giant key, reminiscent of its film appearances. There were also guest appearances from members previously depicted in Challenge of the Super Friends as well as the original Hanna Barbera created hero El Dorado (debuting in the second season), who was added to the show to make the Super Friends more culturally diverse.

In El Dorado's debut episode "Alien Mummy" it is revealed that he is of Mexican descent. The narrator sets the scene by describing the location as 'ancient Aztec ruins in the Mexican wilderness'. One of El Dorado's lines is "these are the mysterious ruins of my people". Black Vulcan is able to spot-weld microelectronics as demonstrated in the episode "Dive to Disaster".

Guest characters and villains
The Riddler made his only solo appearance in a short episode entitled "Around The World In 80 Riddles" again voiced by Michael Bell. Queen Hippolyta as well as Paradise Island appear in the 1980 episode "Return of Atlantis." In her first two appearances, Hippolyta was a brunette however in her last appearance, she was blonde and wore a blue toga. Gorilla Grodd appeared in the short episodes "Two Gleeks Are Deadlier Than One" and "Revenge of Doom" again voiced by Stanley Ralph Ross. In "Two Gleeks are Deadlier Than One", he and Giganta capture Gleek and replace him with a robot duplicate in order to infiltrate the Super Friends and learn what they are planning. In "Revenge of Doom", Gorilla Grodd was seen with the Legion of Doom when they got back together (after salvaging the Legion of Doom headquarters from the swamp and refurbishing it). While all 13 LOD members appear in "Revenge of Doom", only Lex Luthor, Sinestro (voiced this time by Jeff Winkless) and Solomon Grundy (again voiced by Jimmy Weldon) speak.

The three Phantom Zone villains, who first appeared in the 1978 episode "Terror from the Phantom Zone", later return in a "lost season" episode from 1983 titled "Return of the Phantoms". In it which they hijack an alien's time-space conveyor and go back in time to Smallville and attack Superboy (voiced by Jerry Dexter) to prevent him from becoming Superman. Fortunately, the pilot of that craft went to warn the Super Friends about what the trio would be attempting and guided Superman and Green Lantern to the proper time period to help the boy. The Super Friends version of the Phantom Zone is described as, "Far beyond the boundaries of the Milky Way. In the uncharted void of deep space. An incredible 5th dimension of space and time, lies parallel to the universe that we know. This interesting interstellar warp which holds the most sinister and ruthless criminals in the galaxy is the infamous Phantom Zone." The molecular structure of any person exiled in the Zone appears white and black. Batman's devices and the Wonder Twins' Exxor Powers are useless within the Phantom Zone.

Episodes

Cast
 Norman Alden - N/A (credit only)
 Michael Ambrosini -
 Jack Angel - Hawkman, Samurai, Flash (Barry Allen), J. S. Snyder (in "The Make-Up Monster") Spike (in "Cycle Gang"), Gramps (in "Cycle Gang"), Submarine Captain (in Dive To Disaster"), Mayor Summers (in "An Unexpected Treasure")
 Marlene Aragon - Hippolyta (in "Return of Atlantis")
 Lewis Bailey -
 Jered Barclay -
 Michael Bell - Zan, Riddler (in "Around the World In 80 Riddles"), Gleek, Bobby (in "Cycle Gang"), Rom-Lok (in "Return of the Phantoms"), Glook (in "Invasion of the Gleeks")
 Arthur Burghardt - 
 Greg Burson -
 Wally Burr - Atom
 Bill Callaway - Aquaman, Bizarro, Alien Time Traveler (in "Return of the Phantoms")
 Kathy Carver - Rima (in "Return of Atlantis"), Ocina (in "Return of Atlantis")
 Ted Cassidy - Novarian Leader (in "Bigfoot")
 Melanie Chartoff - 
 Philip Lewis Clarke -
 Henry Corden -
 Regis Cordic - Bud (in "The Make-Up Monster")
 Peter Cullen - Slarum Leader (in "Day of the Dinosaurs")
 Danny Dark - Superman
 Takayo Doran -
 Jerry Dexter - Superboy (in "Return of the Phantoms"), Eric
 Jeff Doucette -
 Patty Dworkin -
 Richard Erdman - Space Genie (in "Three Wishes")
 Fernando Escandon - El Dorado
 Al Fann -
 Shannon Farnon - Wonder Woman
 Aileen Fitzpatrick -
 Ruth Forman -  N/A (credit only)
 Pat Fraley -
 Peggy Frees -
 Brian Fuld -
 Joan Gerber - Giganta (in "Two Gleeks are Deadlier Than One")
 Phil Hartman -
 Bob Hastings -
 Bob Holt - Holmes (in "Haunted House"), Logar (in "Return of the Phantoms")
 John Hostetter -
 Erv Immerman - Bat Computer
 Jane James -
 Joyce Jameson -
 David Jolliffe -
 Buster Jones - Black Vulcan
 Stanley Jones - Lex Luthor, Hul (in "Return of the Phantoms")
 Casey Kasem - Robin
 Zale Kessler - Mohawk Spirit (in “Once Upon a Poltergeist”)
 Morgan Lofting -
 Allan Lurie -
 Joyce Mancini -
 Larry D. Mann -
 Kenneth Mars - Warlord (in "The Warlord's Amulet")
 Bill Martin - Technos (in "Day of the Dinosaurs")
 Ross Martin -
 Amanda McBroom -
 Chuck McCann - Colossus (in "Colossus")
 Chuck McClennan -
 Julie McWhirter - Witch (in "The Witch's Arcade")
 Don Messick -
 Pat Parris -
 Richard Paull -
 Vic Perrin - Sailor ("Return of Atlantis"), Sinestro (in "The Revenge of Doom")
 Barney Phillips -
 Patrick Pinney -
 Tony Pope -
 William Ratner - Recruiter (in "The Recruiter")
 James Reynolds -
 Andy Rivas -
 Mike Road -
 Renny Roker -
 Paul Ross -
 Stanley Ralph Ross - Brainiac (in "Superclones"), Gorilla Grodd (in "Two Gleeks are Deadlier Than One"), Chief (in "Bigfoot")
 Dick Ryal -
 Michael Rye - Apache Chief, Green Lantern, Bulgor the Behemoth (in "Bulgor the Behemoth"), Pack (in "Outlaws of Orion"), Romac (in "The Killer Machines")
 Rick Segall -
  Michael Sheehan -
 Olan Soule - Batman, Repair Man
 Andre Stojka - Coal Miner (in "Prisoners of Sleep")
 Robert Strom -
 Lee Thomas -
 Matthew Tobin -
 Janet Waldo - Hawkgirl
 Janis Ward -
 Vernee Watson -
 Jimmy Weldon - Solomon Grundy
 Frank Welker - Mister Mxyzptlk, Dr. Wells (in "Elevator to Nowhere"), Elephant (in "Circus of Horrors")
 Louise Williams - Jayna
 Jeff Winkless - Surgeon (in "A Pint of Life")
 William Woodson - Narrator, Volti Guard (in "Day of the Dinosaurs")
 Lynnanne Zager -
 Marian Zajac -

Reruns, cancellation, and lost episodes
For the 1982–1983 season, ABC continued to run a half-hour of reruns called The Best of the Super Friends, but none of the seven minute shorts were rebroadcast. By 1983, Hanna-Barbera had a syndication package of the earlier Super Friends episodes, distributed by LBS Communications and run from 1983–1986. These episodes were picked up by various stations across the US and were typically broadcast on weekday afternoons. Not wishing to compete with the syndicated programming, ABC dropped the series from the 1983–1984 Saturday morning line-up, and  Super Friends was canceled for the second time. However, during this period of time, Hanna-Barbera continued to produce new episodes of Super Friends.

In total, 8 episodes (24 cartoons) of the "lost episodes" were made, but not aired in the US that season. The series did appear in Australia uninterrupted. One of these episodes were aired when Super Friends returned to Saturday morning ABC television the following year. The remainder of the episodes finally aired in syndication in 1995 as part of the Superman/Batman Adventures show on USA Network. The series also aired on Cartoon Network and Boomerang.

Home media
In April 2009, Warner Home Video (via Hanna-Barbera Cartoons, DC Comics Entertainment and Warner Bros. Family Entertainment) announced their plans to release the 1983 lost episodes of this series in August of that year. They were released as a DVD set, titled Super Friends: The Lost Episodes, on August 11, 2009. In April 2013, Warner Home Video announced Season one episodes would be released on DVD as "Super Friends - Season 5: A Dangerous Fate", on July 23, 2013. Warner Home Video also announced that "Super Friends: Legacy of Super Powers - Season 6" would be released on DVD on October 8, 2013. With the release of Season 6, the entire Super Friends series is available on DVD.

References

External links
 Super Friends at Big Cartoon DataBase
 

1980s American science fiction television series
1980s American animated television series
1980 American television series debuts
1982 American television series endings
American animated television spin-offs
American Broadcasting Company original programming
American children's animated adventure television series
American children's animated science fantasy television series
American children's animated superhero television series
Animated television shows based on DC Comics
Animated Batman television series
Animated Justice League television series
Animated Superman television series
English-language television shows
Super Friends
Television series about shapeshifting
Television series by Hanna-Barbera
Television series set in 1980
Television series set in 1981
Television series set in 1982
Wonder Woman in other media